Kurtzman is a surname. Notable people with the surname include:

 Alex Kurtzman (born 1973), American film and television screenwriter and producer
 David Kurtzman (1904–1977), American university Chancellor
 Harvey Kurtzman (1924–1993), American cartoonist and editor of several comic books and magazines
 Joel Kurtzman (1947–2016), American economist and novelist
 Jeffrey Kurtzman, American musicologist and music editor
 Katy Kurtzman (born 1965), American actress
 Robert Kurtzman (born 1964), American film director, producer, screenwriter, and special effects creator

See also
 Lemon v. Kurtzman, a legal case

Jewish surnames